Greenfly may refer to:

 Green peach aphid, a variety of aphid which is commonly known as greenfly in Britain and the Commonwealth
 Common green bottle fly, an insect
 Greenfly (producer), the artist name of Lawrence Green, an English drum and bass music producer
 Self-replicating spacecraft, a fictional self-replicating space craft in the science fiction novels by Alastair Reynolds
 Tabanus nigrovittatus, a biting horsefly more commonly known as the greenhead horsefly, greenhead fly, or greenhead